The U.S. Post Office and Courthouse-Baton Rouge, also known as Federal Building and U.S. Courthouse, in Baton Rouge, Louisiana, was built in 1932.  It includes Art Deco and Moderne architecture.  It served historically as a post office, as a courthouse, and as a government office building.

It is a limestone-clad three-story building designed by New Orleans architect Moise H. Goldstein, under the supervision of the Office of the Supervising Architect for the U.S. Treasury department in Art Deco style.  It has a slightly projected central bay with four engaged, fluted Ionic pilasters.

The building was listed on the National Register of Historic Places on May 18, 2000.

See also 
National Register of Historic Places listings in East Baton Rouge Parish, Louisiana
List of United States post offices

References 

Art Deco courthouses
Post office buildings on the National Register of Historic Places in Louisiana
Courthouses on the National Register of Historic Places in Louisiana
Former federal courthouses in the United States
Government buildings completed in 1932
Moderne architecture in Louisiana
Art Deco architecture in Louisiana
Buildings and structures in Baton Rouge, Louisiana
Courthouses in Louisiana
National Register of Historic Places in Baton Rouge, Louisiana